The geography of New Caledonia (Nouvelle-Calédonie), an overseas collectivity of France located in the subregion of Melanesia, makes the continental island group unique in the southwest Pacific. Among other things, the island chain has played a role in preserving unique biological lineages from the Mesozoic. It served as a waystation in the expansion of the predecessors of the Polynesians, the Lapita culture. Under the Free French it was a vital naval base for Allied Forces during the War in the Pacific.

The archipelago is located east of Australia, north of New Zealand, south of the Equator, and just west of Fiji and Vanuatu. New Caledonia comprises a main island, Grande Terre, the Loyalty Islands, and several smaller islands.

New Caledonia is one of the northernmost parts of an almost entirely (93%) submerged continent called Zealandia which rifted away from Antarctica between 130 and 85 million years ago (mya), and from Australia 85–60 mya. (Most of the elongated triangular continental mass of Zealandia is a subsurface plateau. New Zealand is a mountainous above-water promontory in its center, and New Caledonia is a promontory ridge on the continent's northern edge.) New Caledonia itself drifted away from Australia 66 mya, and subsequently drifted in a north-easterly direction, reaching its present position about 50 mya. Given its long stability and isolation, New Caledonia serves as a unique island refugium—a sort of biological 'ark'—hosting a unique ecosystem and preserving Gondwanan plant and animal lineages no longer found elsewhere.

Composition

New Caledonia is made up of a main island, the Grande Terre, and several smaller islands, the Belep archipelago to the north of the Grande Terre, the Loyalty Islands to the east of the Grande Terre, the (Isle of Pines) to the south of the Grande Terre, the Chesterfield Islands and Bellona Reefs further to the west. Each of these four island groups has a different geological origin:

 The New Caledonia archipelago, which includes Grande Terre, Belep, and the Île des Pins was born as a series of folds of the earth's mantle between the Permian period (251–299 mya) and the Paleogene and Neogene periods (1.5–66 mya). This mantle obduction created large areas of peridotite and a bedrock rich in nickel.
 The Loyalty Islands, a hundred kilometers to the east, are coral and limestone islands built on top of ancient collapsed volcanoes originating due to subduction at the Vanuatu trench.
 The Chesterfield Islands,  to the northwest, are reef outcroppings of the oceanic plateau.

The Grande Terre is by far the largest of the islands, and the only mountainous island. The highest point is Mont Panié at  elevation.

A territorial dispute exists with regard to the uninhabited Matthew and Hunter Islands, which are claimed by both France (as part of New Caledonia) and Vanuatu.

Zealandian origin

The New Caledonian archipelago is a microcontinental island chain which originated as a fragment of Zealandia, a nearly submerged continent or microcontinent which was part of the southern supercontinent of Gondwana during the time of the dinosaurs. While they were still one landmass, Zealandia and Australia combined broke away from Antarctica between 85 and 130 million years ago. Australia and Zealandia split apart 60–85 million years ago. Although biologists consider it contrary to the evidence of surviving Gondwanan lineages, geologists consider the logical possibility that Zealandia may have been completely submerged about 23 million years ago. While a continent like Australia consists of a large body of land surrounded by a fringe of continental shelf, Zealandia consists almost entirely of continental shelf, with the vast majority, some 93%, submerged beneath the Pacific Ocean. This viewpoint is not universal. Bernard Pelletier argues that Grande Terre was completely submerged for millions of years, and hence the origin of the flora may not be local in nature, but due to long distance-dispersal.

It is unusually slender, stretching from New Caledonia in the north to beyond New Zealand's subantarctic islands in the south (from latitude 19° south to 56° south, analogous to ranging from Haiti to Hudson Bay or from Sudan to Sweden in the Northern Hemisphere). New Zealand is the greatest part of Zealandia above sea level, followed by New Caledonia.

Given its continental origin as a fragment of Zealandia, unlike many of the islands of the Pacific such as the Hawaiian chain, New Caledonia is not of geographically recent volcanic provenance. Its separation from Australia at the end of the Cretaceous (65 mya) and from New Zealand in the mid-Miocene has led to a long period of evolution in near complete isolation. New Caledonia's natural heritage significantly comprises species whose ancestors were ancient and primitive flora and fauna present on New Caledonia when it broke away from Gondwana millions of years ago, not only species but entire genera and even families are unique to the island, and survive nowhere else.

Since the age of the dinosaurs, as the island moved north due to the effects of continental drift, some geologists assert that it may have been fully submerged at various intervals. Botanists, however, argue that there must have been some areas that remained above sea level, serving as refugia for the descendants of the original flora that inhabited the island when it broke away from Gondwana. The isolation of New Caledonia was not absolute, however. New species came to New Caledonia while species of Gondwanan origin were able to penetrate further eastward into the Pacific Island region.

Climate

The climate of New Caledonia is tropical, modified by southeasterly trade winds. It is hot and humid. Natural hazards are posed in New Caledonia by cyclones, which occur most frequently between November and March. The capital, Nouméa, located on a peninsula on the southwestern coast of the island normally has a dry season which increases in intensity from August until mid-December, ending suddenly with the coming of rain in January. The northeastern coast of the island receives the most rain, with  having been recorded near sea level in Pouébo.

Terrain
The terrain of Grande Terre consists of coastal plains, with mountains in the interior.

The Diahot River is the longest river of New Caledonia, flowing for some 60 miles (100 kilometres). It has a catchment area of 620 square kilometres and opens north-westward into the Baie d'Harcourt, flowing towards the northern point of the island along the western escarpment of the Mount Panie.

In 1993, 12% of New Caledonian land was used for permanent pasture, with 39% occupied by forests and woodland. In 1991,  of the land was irrigated. A current environmental issue is erosion caused by mining exploitation and forest fires.

Biological isolation

Given its geographical isolation since the end of the Cretaceous, New Caledonia is a refugium, in effect a biological "Noah's Ark", an island home to both unique living plants and animals and also to its own special fossil endowment. Birds such as the crested and almost flightless kagu (French, cagou) Rhynochetos jubatus, whose closest relative may be the distantly related sunbittern of South America, and plants such as Amborella trichopoda, the only known member of the most basal living branch of flowering plants, make this island a treasure trove and a critical concern for biologists and conservationists. The island was home to horned fossil turtles (Meiolania mackayi) and terrestrial fossil crocodiles (Mekosuchus inexpectatus) which became extinct shortly after human arrival. There are no native amphibians, with geckos holding many of their niches. The crested gecko (Correlophus ciliatus), thought to have gone extinct, was rediscovered in 1994. At 14 inches, Leach's giant gecko (Rhacodactylus leachianus), the world's largest and a predator of smaller lizards is another native. The only native mammals are four species of bat including the endemic New Caledonia flying fox.

New Caledonia is home to 13 of the 19 extant species of evergreens in the genus Araucaria. The island has been called "a kind of 'Jurassic Park'" because of the archaic characteristics of its highly endemic vegetation. In addition to the basal angiosperm plant genus Amborella, for example, the island is home to more gymnosperm species than any other tropic landmass, with 43 of its 44 conifer species being unique to the island, which is also home to the world's only known parasitic gymnosperm, the rootless conifer Parasitaxus usta.

Given their prehistoric appearance, the dry forests of western New Caledonia were chosen as the location for filming the first episode of the BBC miniseries Walking with Dinosaurs, which was set in the Arizona of the late Triassic.

Mineral wealth

After a formation discovered in Oman in the 1970s, New Caledonia has the planet's largest known outcrop of ultrabasic rock, derived not from the crust, but from an upthrust fold of the more deeply underlying mantle of the earth. These mineral-rich rocks are a source of nickel, chromium, iron, cobalt, manganese, silver, gold, lead and copper. The toxicity of the mineral-rich soil has helped preserve the endemic vegetation, which has long been adapted to it, from competition from would-be colonizers which find it unsuitable.

Human geography

Before Western contact
Anthropologically, New Caledonia is considered the southernmost archipelago of Melanesia, grouping it with the more close by islands to its north, rather than its geologically associated neighbour, New Zealand, to the south. The New Caledonian languages, whose speakers are called Kanaks, and the dialects of the Loyalty Islands find their closest relatives in the languages of Vanuatu to the east. Together, these comprise the Southern Oceanic language family, a member of the Oceanic language branch of the Austronesian language family. The Fijian languages, the Māori language of New Zealand, and other Polynesian languages such as Tahitian, Samoan and Hawaiian are cousins of the New Caledonian languages within the Oceanic language family.

Linguistic analysis using the comparative method provides a detailed family tree of the Austronesian languages to which the native languages of New Caledonia belong. The Lapita culture, hypothesized to have spoken proto-Oceanic, and defined by its typical style of pottery, originated to the northwest in the Bismarck Archipelago around 1500 BC. The earliest known human settlement of New Caledonia, dated to 1240 ±220 BC at the Tiwi rockshelter, is attributed to the Lapitans, who then moved on to Fiji by approximately 900 BC, whence the Polynesian expansion would begin.

Since Western contact
Western colonization of the area began in the 18th century. The British explorer James Cook sighted Grande Terre in 1774 and named it New Caledonia, Caledonia being Latin for Scotland. In 1853, under Napoleon III, the area was made a French colony. The French brought colonial subjects such as Arabs from the Maghreb to settle in the territory. Given its strategic location and that it was unoccupied by Japanese troops it played a vital role under the Free French Forces as an Allied Forces naval base during the Second World War.

Today, while French is the official language, 28 indigenous tongues are still spoken. At the 2004 census, 97.0% reported they could speak French, whereas only 0.97% reported that they had no knowledge of French. In the same census, 37.1% reported that they could speak (but not necessarily read or write) one of the 28 indigenous Austronesian languages.

At the 1996 census, the indigenous Melanesian Kanak community represented 44.6% of the whole population. They are no longer a majority, their proportion of the population having declined due to immigration and other factors. The rest of the population is made up of ethnic groups that arrived in New Caledonia in the last 150 years: Europeans (34.5%) (predominantly French, with German, British and Italian minorities), Polynesians (Wallisians, Tahitians) (11.8%), Indonesians (2.6%), Vietnamese (1.4%), Ni-Vanuatu (1.2%), and various other groups (3.9%), Tamils, other South Asians, Berbers, Japanese, Chinese, Fijians, Arabs, West Indian (mostly from other French territories) and a small number of ethnic Africans.

See also

 d'Entrecasteaux Ridge
 List of islands of New Caledonia

Other microcontinental islands:
 Madagascar
 Seychelles
 Socotra

References

External links
 Croixdusud.info a site in both English and French including information on the geography, geology, and biodiversity of the area